Ophoniscus is a genus of beetles in the family Carabidae, containing the following species:

 Ophoniscus batesi Kataev, 2005
 Ophoniscus cribrifrons Bates, 1892
 Ophoniscus hypolithoides Bates, 1892
 Ophoniscus insulicola N. Ito, 1994
 Ophoniscus iridulus Bates, 1892
 Ophoniscus lopatini Kataev, 2005

References

Harpalinae